Krstarica is one of the most visited web portals in Serbia. It was founded in March 1999.

Includes search engine, forum, online chat, up-to-date daily news from Serbia, directory of the local sites grouped by the topics and variety of content.

Krstarica has 1.6 million visitors per month.

History and growth
Krstarica was founded in 1999 by Ivan Petrović, as a result of Ivan's hobby during a pursuit of a university degree in information systems.

With time, it developed into the most prominent Internet brand in Serbia, which has changed the way in which information is communicated, accessed, and exchanged.

Products and services
Krstarica offers a number of other Internet services and content (majority available in Serbian language, only).

Communication: Krstarica provides communication services such as Forum and Chat. Forum is a message board which allows the visitors a complete freedom to choose topics they want to discuss with other visitors. Forum is what Krstarica is probably most recognised for in the country and the Balkan region.

Search: According to magazines "Mikro - PC World", "PC Press", "Svet kompjutera" and "Digital!", Krstarica is the best search engine in Serbia. Krstarica Search enables its visitors to find on the Internet everything they need.

The following content is available on Krstarica and constantly updated:

News and service information: Daily headlines classified according to categories; business information; an overview of cultural events; weather forecast; currency rates list; TV programme...
Entertainment: The Life,  which among others includes Technique, Film, Music, Games, jokes, cooking recipes, horoscope...
Education: A diverse and always up-to-date catalog comprising international and local websites grouped into themes; Serbian dictionary; a section devoted to health; sections "Travel", "Did you know", "Thoughts of the famous", "This is what happened on today's day"...

References

External links
Official website

Web portals
Serbian websites
1999 establishments in Serbia
Internet properties established in 1999